The 2011 Men's World Open Squash Championship is the men's edition of the 2011 World Open, which serves as the individual world championship for squash players. The event took place at the squash club Victoria Squash Rotterdam and at the Luxor Theater in Rotterdam in the Netherlands from 1 to 6 November 2011. Nick Matthew successfully defended his title, defeating Grégory Gaultier in the final.

Prize money and ranking points
For 2011, the prize purse was $275,000. The prize money and points breakdown is as follows:

Seeds

Draw and results

Finals

Top half

Section 1

Section 2

Bottom half

Section 1

Section 2

See also
World Open
2011 Women's World Open Squash Championship
2011 Men's World Team Squash Championships

References

External links
World Open 2011 official website
Worldopensquash.com

World Squash Championships
M
Men's World Open Squash
Squash tournaments in the Netherlands
Sports competitions in Rotterdam
International sports competitions hosted by the Netherlands